Acquisition may refer to:

 Takeover, the purchase of one company by another
 Mergers and acquisitions, transactions in which the ownership of companies or their operating units are transferred or consolidated with other entities
 Procurement, finding, agreeing terms and acquiring goods, services or works from an external source
 Library acquisitions, department of a library responsible for the selection and purchase of materials
 Military acquisition, the process of acquiring products for national defense
 Acquiring bank, a bank or financial institution that processes credit or debit card payments on behalf of a merchant
 Acquisition (contract law), process by which the Federal Government of the U.S. acquires goods, services, and interests in real property
 Acquisition (forensic process), the creation of a disk image for use in digital forensics
 Acquisition (linguistic), process by which humans acquire the capacity to perceive and comprehend language
 Acquisition (psychology), learning
 Acquisition stage, the time during which a conditional response first appears and when it increases in frequency
 Acquisition (Star Trek: Enterprise)

See also 
 
 
 Acquire, board game
 Acquire (company)
 Acquired characteristic
 Acquired lands 
 Acquired taste
 Buy (disambiguation)
 Get (disambiguation)
 Taken (disambiguation)
 Taker (disambiguation)
 The Take (disambiguation)